Yokotake Dam is a gravity dam located in Saga Prefecture in Japan. The dam is used for flood control. The catchment area of the dam is 8.3 km2. The dam impounds about 23  ha of land when full and can store 4290 thousand cubic meters of water. The construction of the dam was started on 1973 and completed in 2001.

References

Dams in Saga Prefecture
2001 establishments in Japan